Tobias Carlsson (born 28 July 1995) is a Swedish football defender who plays for BK Häcken.

References

1995 births
Living people
Swedish footballers
Association football defenders
Varbergs BoIS players
BK Häcken players
Ettan Fotboll players
Superettan players
Allsvenskan players